Joanne Samuel (born 5 August 1957) is an Australian film and television actress, who is best known for her role as the screen wife of Mel Gibson's title character in the 1979 film Mad Max.

Biography and career

Samuel was born in Camperdown, Sydney, Australia. She studied dance with Honeybrooks and drama at the Independent Theatre.

Prior to her appearance in Mad Max, Samuel had made guest appearances in police procedurals Matlock Police and Homicide. She was then a regular cast member in television soap operas Class of '74, The Sullivans and The Young Doctors. She left The Young Doctors after the producers wrote her out of the show when she was offered the Mad Max role after a fellow Young Doctors actress who had been due to take the role fell ill. Samuel later returned to television in the regular role of Kelly Morgan-Young in Skyways.

Samuel's other film appearances included roles in Alison's Birthday (1981), Early Frost (1982), Queen of the Road (1984), The Long Way Home (1985), Nightmaster (1987, opposite Nicole Kidman), Gallagher's Travels (1987), and Spook (1988). She later guest starred in Hey Dad..! as Jeanette Taylor and All Saints, and played Ms. Bingle in The Wiggles Movie (1997).

Samuel is the vice chairman of BOOMPAA, Blue Mountains Performing Arts Association. She appeared as Doris Mercher in the 2017 family film My Pet Dinosaur, directed by Matt Drummond.

Filmography

Film

Television

References

External links 
 

1957 births
Living people
Australian film actresses
Australian television actresses